HB Arcade Cards is a video game by HB Studios consisting of a collection of six card games (rummy, hearts, euchre, canasta, cribbage, and solitaire) for WiiWare. It was released in North America on July 27, 2009.

Reception
Nintendo Life criticized the basic presentation of the games and the complete lack of multiplayer. They also noted superior versions of the included games were available for free elsewhere although not on the Wii. IGN echoed these sentiments, stating that "at $5, HB Arcade Cards actually provides less functionality than a $1 pack of cards".

References

2009 video games
Digital card games
HB Studios games
North America-exclusive video games
Patience video games
Single-player video games
Video games developed in Canada
Wii-only games
WiiWare games
Wii games